Roads in Serbia are the backbone of its transportation system and an important part of the European road network. The total length of roads in  the country is 45,419 km, and they are categorized as "state roads" (total length of 16,179 km) or "municipal roads" (total length of 23,780 km). All state roads in Serbia are maintained by the public, nation-wide, road construction company JP Putevi Srbije.

State roads

Major roads in the country are designated as "state roads", most of which are paved. They are categorized into class I and class II, each with two sub-classes, A and B.

State roads, class IA

Roads that are motorways are categorized as state roads, class IA, and are marked with one-digit numbers (the "A1", "A2", "A3", "A4" or "A5" road designations represent "autoput", the Serbian word for motorway). As of March 2020, there are 924.6 km of motorways in total. Motorways in Serbia have three lanes in each direction (including the hard shoulder), signs are white-on-green, and the normal speed limit is 130 km/h.

State roads, class IB
Roads categorized as state roads, class IB are 4,481 km in total length and are marked with two-digit numbers. They have one lane in each direction, signs are black-on-yellow and the normal speed limit is 80 km/h.

Some of these roads are or will be partially expressways, such as the 24 km-long stretch of State Road 24 between Kragujevac and Batočina (intersection with A1 motorway) and the planned upgrade of the 27 km-long section of State Road 21 between Novi Sad and Ruma (intersection with A1 motorway). Expressways, unlike motorways, do not have emergency lanes, signs are white-on-blue and the normal speed limit is 100 km/h.

Kosovo 
Roads that partly or entirely lay in Kosovo (see Roads in Kosovo).

State roads, class IIA
State roads, class IIA, are marked with three-digit numbers, the first digit being 1 or 2. The total length of these roads is 7,781 km.

State roads, class IIB
State roads, class IIB, are marked with three-digit numbers, first digit being 3 or 4. Total length of these roads is 3,160 km.

Municipal roads

Minor, local roads in the country are designated as "municipal roads".
Total length of these roads is 23,780 km and some two-thirds are paved roads, while the rest are consisted of macadam and earthen roads.

European routes
The following European routes pass through Serbia:
  E65: Rožaje, Montenegro – Tutin – Mitrovica – Pristina – Elez Han, Kosovo – Skopje, North Macedonia.
  E70: Slavonski Brod, Croatia – Šid – Belgrade – Vršac – Timișoara, Romania.
 section between Belgrade and border with Croatia is built to motorway standards.
  E75: Szeged, Hungary – Subotica – Novi Sad – Beška Bridge – Belgrade – Niš – Leskovac – Vranje – Preševo – Kumanovo, North Macedonia.
 section from border with Hungary to border with Northern Macedonia is built to motorway standards.
  E80: Rožaje, Montenegro – Peja – Pristina, Kosovo – Prokuplje – Niš – Niška Banja – Pirot – Dimitrovgrad – Sofia, Bulgaria.
 section between Niš and border with Bulgaria is built to motorway standards.
  E662: Subotica – Sombor – Bezdan – Osijek, Croatia.
  E761: Sarajevo, Bosnia and Herzegovina – Užice – Čačak –  Kraljevo – Kruševac – Pojate – Paraćin – Zaječar.
 section between Pojate and Paraćin is built to motorway standards and co-signed with E75.
  E763: Belgrade – Čačak – Nova Varoš – Bijelo Polje, Montenegro.
 section between Belgrade and Preljina is built to motorway standards.
  E771: Drobeta-Turnu Severin, Romania – Zaječar – Niš.

Notes

References

External links
 Putevi Srbije

See also
Road signs in Serbia

 
Transport in Serbia